Algoma Steel Inc. (formerly Algoma Steel; Essar Steel Algoma) is an integrated primary steel producer located on the St. Marys River in Sault Ste. Marie, Ontario, Canada. Its products are sold in Canada and the United States as well as overseas. Algoma Steel was founded in 1902 by Francis Clergue, an American entrepreneur who had settled in Sault Ste. Marie. The company emerged from bankruptcy protection in 2004. In April 2007, Algoma Steel was purchased by India's Essar Group for US$ 1.63 billion, continuing operations as a subsidiary known as Essar Steel Algoma Inc. It was purchased again in 2017, by a group of US investors. 

In May 2021, it was announced that Algoma "was to become a public company again" as it had agreed a merger with New York-based acquisition firm Legato Merger Corp, which is a NASDAQ-listed special-purpose acquisition company. The deal would give Algoma just over $1.1 billion US worth of new shares in Legato.

History

Construction of the steelworks started in February, 1901. On February 18, 1902 the first Bessemer converter was put in operation using pig iron made from the Helen mine, owned by Algoma.  The first rails were produced by the complex in May 1902. However, blast furnaces for pig iron manufacture were not completed at the site until 1904. Unlike most other steel producers, Algoma had no access to local coal, forcing it to import coal and coke from the United States.  The Bessemer process was felt to produce steel that was well-suited to manufacture of rails, which was the Algoma complex's primary product for the first two decades of its existence.

Shortly after founding Algoma, Clergue's various financial operations suffered reverses and he lost control of the Sault Ste. Marie complex, being replaced as general manager in 1903 and by 1908 was no longer on the company's board of directors.  Initially the company specialized in manufacture of rails for Canadian railways, but this soon became a dead-end as railway construction passed its peak.

During the First World War Algoma made steel for artillery shells but after the war continued to rely on rail production. The necessity of importing ore and coal from the United States due to the low quality of Canadian iron ore, as well as the absentee owners' greater interest in annual dividends than building a viable industrial complex, held back Algoma during the 1920s.  At the height of the Great Depression, the company was insolvent and in receivership until Sir James Dunn gained control in 1935 and restored it to profitability. Dunn's policy of never paying a dividend to stockholders, coupled with extensive modernization and expansion during the Second World War, and an extended period of steel demand up until the mid-1950s, allowed Algoma to expand and become a more balanced steel producer.

From 1988 to 1991 Algoma was owned by Dofasco, making the combined company the largest steel producer in Canada.  However, a strike at Algoma and other Dofasco subsidiaries in 1990 caused Dofasco to abandon ownership.

The high value of the Canadian dollar coupled with competition from mini mills, lower-cost and currency-strong Asian countries and dumping by Japanese companies has hurt Canadian primary steel producers. In 2002, the company emerged from bankruptcy protection for the second time in a decade, having previously gone into bankruptcy in 1990. Denis Turcotte, the President and CEO, was largely credited with Algoma's resurgence, making it one of the most efficient steelmakers in North America.

Algoma Steel announced on August 3, 2005, that the company was no longer for sale after a $64.7 million second quarter profit. The company stated that they are going to focus on value-enhancing, non-sale alternatives. Algoma also announced a special dividend of $6.00 per share payable on August 31, 2005 to shareholders of record on August 17, 2005 and a normal course issuer bid for up to 3.3 million shares.

On February 8, 2006, Algoma Steel announced a $55 million profit for their fourth quarter ending December 31, 2005. As a result of this and redemption of their 11% notes on January 9, 2006 the company declared themselves debt free and had an operating surplus of over $400 million in cash. This cash surplus attracted the attention of some shareholders who wanted to see the cash distributed as dividends, echoing Algoma's historic problems almost exactly a century earlier.

In October 2006, Algoma Steel was awarded a power purchase agreement by the Ontario Power Authority to build, own and operate a co-generation power plant utilizing by-product fuels such as blast furnace gas (BFG) and coke oven gas (COG); Algoma Steel has founded a limited partnership company called Algoma Energy LP to own and operate the co-generation facility. The facility's contract capacity was said to be 63MW.

On 15 April 2007, Essar Global made an offer to acquire Algoma Steel Inc. for 1.85 billion CAD in cash. It was announced on 20 June that Essar had completed its purchase of all outstanding shares.

On June 23, 2008, following its purchase by Essar Group, Algoma Steel Inc. announced that its name had been changed to Essar Steel Algoma Inc. This came along with a logo change to the Essar Steel company logo.

On May 26, 2017, Essar Steel Algoma was rebranded once again, simply called Algoma. The announcement was made in Sault Ste. Marie, Ontario. For legal purposes, the factory will remain "Essar Steel Algoma Inc." until the company emerges from insolvency protection.

In May 2021 Algoma had a yearly production capacity of 2.8 million tonnes of steel, for which it employed around 2,700 people.

Steel making facilities

Algoma currently has a capacity of 4 million tons per year.  Primary steel making facilities include two blast furnaces, three coke batteries,  two, 260 short ton  basic oxygen furnaces, with two ladle metallurgy stations for refining and alloying.  Algoma has a direct strip production complex manufactured by Danieli of Italy, which casts strip directly and then rolls it to finished strip in the range of 0.047 inches to 0.625 inches in thickness, and widths to 64 inches. Algoma also operates a hot strip mill, a plate mill, and a cold strip mill. Algoma also manufactures welded structural beams.

Current status
Algoma currently is the second largest steel producer in Canada.  It is the largest employer in Sault Ste. Marie and currently has 2800 employees at the main plant. Algoma now produces hot and cold rolled steel (i.e. sheet and plate).

Algoma's products are used in the automotive, construction, energy, manufacturing, pipe and tube, and steel distribution industries.

On June 15, 2009, Essar Steel Algoma successfully started up a new, 85 MW cogeneration facility, to produce electricity and steam from the by-products of the coke making and iron making processes.

It features two 375,000 lb/hr boilers and a 105MW turbine combined with other related components such as a generator, a blast furnace gas holder, condensate and feed-water systems, a water treatment plant, a cooling tower, a transformer, and a distributed control system. Essar has set a precedent as the first integrated steel manufacturer in Canada to construct a co-generation facility fueled with by-product gas from the operation.

References

Further reading

External links
Algoma production facilities 
 Algoma SIAG press release
 New name for Algoma Steel, SooToday.com, 23 June 2008.

Steel companies of Canada
Essar Group
Companies based in Sault Ste. Marie, Ontario
Companies listed on the Nasdaq
Companies listed on the Toronto Stock Exchange
Manufacturing companies established in 1902
1902 establishments in Canada
Special-purpose acquisition companies
History of the steel industry in Ontario

gu:એસ્સાર ગ્રુપ
ko:에사르 그룹
hi:एस्सार समूह
it:Essar
kn:ಎಸ್ಸಾರ್‌ ಉದ್ಯಮ ಸಮೂಹ
ja:エッサール・グループ
ta:எஸ்ஸார் குழுமம்